Soft Shoulders, Sharp Curves is an erotic, comedy film directed by Gabriel Axel and Richard R. Rimmel, and released in 1972.

Cast

References

External links

1972 films
1970s German-language films
West German films
1970s sex comedy films
Films directed by Gabriel Axel
Films scored by Gerhard Heinz
German sex comedy films
1972 comedy films
1970s German films